Rudozem is a town in southern Bulgaria, near the Greek border, located in the Rhodope Mountains, where the Elhovo and Chepino rivers flow into the Arda, and is part of Smolyan Province. It is the administrative centre of the homonymous Rudozem Municipality. As of December 2009, the town has a population of 3,583 inhabitants.

The name Rudozem is a compound word made up of Bulgarian ruda (руда) meaning "ore"; and the root zem (зем) meaning "land". It refers to the wealth of the area in mineral resources. Its former name is Palas. During the rule of the Ottoman Empire, it was part of the Ottoman İskeçe sanjak in Edirne vilayet between 1867 and 1912.

Rudozem Heights on Fallières Coast in Antarctica is named after the town.

Notes

Towns in Bulgaria
Cities and towns in the Rhodopes
Populated places in Smolyan Province